Joseph Michael McShane  (born June 19, 1949) is an American Jesuit priest, who served as President of Fordham University from 2003 until his retirement in 2022. Before becoming President of Fordham University, McShane was the President of the University of Scranton and Dean of Fordham College at Rose Hill. In addition to his role as President of Fordham, McShane was appointed to the Commission on Metropolitan Transportation Authority (MTA) Financing by New York Governor David A. Paterson in 2008. On July 1, 2009, McShane threw out the ceremonial first pitch at Yankee Stadium to commemorate the 150th anniversary of baseball at Fordham. In September 2021, he announced his resignation in June 2022. Soon after his resignation, he was unanimously named President Emeritus of the university by Fordham's Board of Trustees.

Background 

McShane grew up in New York City and graduated from Regis High School. He earned his bachelor's degree from Boston College and went on to earn a master's degree from the same institution in 1972. In 1977, McShane was ordained as a Jesuit priest, after receiving his M.Div and S.T.M. degrees from the Jesuit School of Theology at Berkeley. In 1981, McShane received his Ph.D. in the history of Christianity from the University of Chicago.

Career 

From 1982 to 1992, McShane served as a professor of religious studies and eventually chair of religious studies at Le Moyne College. In 1992 he was made Dean of Fordham College at Rose Hill, the largest undergraduate college of Fordham University, where he served until 1998. That year, McShane left Fordham to become the president of the University of Scranton, a Jesuit institution. In 2003 McShane was inaugurated as the 32nd President of Fordham University, the post he held until June 2022.

Currently, McShane is a trustee of Fordham University ex officio, Santa Clara University in California, the YMCA of Greater New York, and the Commission on Independent Colleges and Universities.  He formerly served on the board of Loyola University New Orleans. McShane also serves on the board of the Association of Jesuit Colleges and Universities. He also serves on the Bloomberg Philanthropies Board of Directors.

In 2006 McShane unveiled a plan to enhance the reputation and the quality of education at Fordham University. The long-term goal of the University, according to McShane's plan, is to make Fordham the country's preeminent Catholic institution of higher learning. McShane believes that Fordham's location within New York City and its identity as a Jesuit institution are central to this vision. McShane has identified four key components of this strategic plan, as stated in a University press release:

 to advance the culture of scholarship, teaching, research and service for faculty by investing in endowed chairs and faculty development to enhance recruitment and retention and secure world-class stature for University professors
 to develop graduate and professional programs that can win distinctive excellence, national prominence and external support, as well as enhance the graduate and professional learning environment
 to develop and sustain an undergraduate culture of learning and living that will be recognized for distinctive excellence and achieve national prominence
 to generate and sustain the funding necessary to support investments in physical resources and the University endowment, and to fuel growth in annual giving.

Part of the plan was entitled Toward 2016, a reference toward the 175th anniversary of the founding of Fordham University. This 10-year phase was approved in 2005, and sought to raise Fordham to prominence among American Catholic universities by 2016.

Additionally, McShane has unveiled an ambitious plan for the Lincoln Center Campus of Fordham University. The plan involves razing  several buildings on the  Lincoln Center campus to make room for a new School of Law, an expanded library, student housing, a student activities center, and parking facilities. The plan will add an additional  of space to the campus. On June 30, 2009, the plan was approved by the New York City Council.

Criticism
On April 19, 2017, Fordham University faculty voted no confidence in President McShane's leadership, based on violations of shared governance and his administration's management of a labor dispute with the University's contingent faculty. The vote was 88% in favor of no confidence. However, the Board of Trustees took responsibility for some of the issues at play.

Retirement 
On September 2, 2021, McShane announced that he intended to step down as president at the end of the school year in June 2022.  In February 2022, Tania Tetlow was announced as his successor.

References 

 The University's Strategic Planning is in Full Swing
 Father McShane named 32nd President
 New York Times article describing the plans for the Lincoln Center campus
 The President's Report 2005–2006
 Fordham Unveils Lincoln Center Master Plan 
 STATEMENT OF MAYOR MICHAEL R. BLOOMBERG ON CITY COUNCIL APPROVAL OF THE LOWER CONCOURSE AND FORDHAM REZONINGS

1949 births
Living people
Presidents of the University of Scranton
Presidents of Fordham University
20th-century American Jesuits
21st-century American Jesuits
University of Chicago alumni
Boston College alumni
Le Moyne College faculty
American theologians
Regis High School (New York City) alumni